Belyakovka is a rural locality (a village) in Nigmatullinsky Selsoviet, Alsheyevsky District, Bashkortostan, Russia. The population was 14 as of 2010. There is 1 street.

Geography 
Belyakovka is located 50 km southeast of Rayevsky (the district's administrative centre) by road. Neforoshchanka is the nearest rural locality.

References 

Rural localities in Alsheyevsky District